Alfred Dockery House is a historic plantation house located near Rockingham, Richmond County, North Carolina.  It was built about 1840, and is a two-story, five bay, brick dwelling with a low hipped roof in the Greek Revival style.  It rests on a brick foundation and has two ells.  The house was restored in 1951.  Also on the property are the contributing remains of an outbuilding and the remains of a water-powered mill.  It was the home of Congressman and brigadier general of the Tennessee State Militia Alfred Dockery (1797-1875).

It was listed on the National Register of Historic Places in 1986.

References

Plantation houses in North Carolina
Houses on the National Register of Historic Places in North Carolina
Greek Revival houses in North Carolina
Houses completed in 1840
Houses in Randolph County, North Carolina
National Register of Historic Places in Richmond County, North Carolina